Southedge is a rural locality in the Shire of Mareeba, Queensland, Australia. In the  Southedge had a population of 21 people.

Geography 
The major road thoroughfare in Southedge is the Mulligan Highway.

The Southedge-Wangetti Road, also known as Quaid Road or Southedge Road was completed with Queensland Government approval in 1989, currently with no public access linking Wangetti to Southedge. The Wet Tropics Management Authority control access to sections of the road, that would otherwise be trafficable from the Mulligan Highway to the Captain Cook Highway and to Kuranda through the Black Mountain Road.

The Southedge Dam, also known as the Lake Mitchell Dam, is an earth filled embankment dam across the Mitchell River.

History 
In the  Southedge had a population of 21 people.

References 

Shire of Mareeba
Localities in Queensland